Prayer shawl may refer to:

Tallit, in Judaism
A mantilla in Roman Catholic Christianity.
A prayer cloth found among some Pentecostal Christians.